is a 2004 Japanese horror comedy television series directed by Kenji Murakami, Takashi Shimizu, Keisuke Toyoshima and Yūdai Yamaguchi, which aired on TV Tokyo affiliated stations.

Episodes 
 Season 1, Episode 1: The Horror! The Cursed Imawano Family, 3 October 2004.
 Season 1, Episode 2: The Horror! The World Osamu Doesn't Know About, 10 October 2004.
 Season 1, Episode 3: Horrifying! Kiwa's Tea Drinking Friend, 17 October 2004.
 Season 1, Episode 4: The Horror! The Cursed Portrait, 24 October 2004.
 Season 1, Episode 5: The Horror! The Alien You Prefer, 31 October 2004.
 Season 1, Episode 6: Ghost Story! Red Light Spirit Tsuyako, 7 November 2004.
 Season 1, Episode 7: Grotesque! The Cursed Gothic Lolita, 14 November 2004.
 Season 1, Episode 8: True Story! Afterlife of Honor, 21 November 2004.
 Season 1, Episode 9: Escape! The Imawano Family and the Cursed Maze, 28 November 2004.
 Season 1, Episode 10: The Horror! Kiyoshi's Cursed Countdown, 5 December 2004.
 Season 1, Episode 11: Extreme! Kiyoshi's Family and the World Over There, 12 December 2004.
 Season 1, Episode 12: Bizarre! ...the original Great Family, 19 December 2004.
 Season 1, Episode 13: A Bizarre! ...and Great Family, 26 December 2004.

Cast 
 Shunji Fujimura - Fuchio Imawano	
 Issei Takahashi - Kiyoshi Imawano	
 Tomiko Ishii - Kiwa Imawano	
 Shigeru Muroi - Yuko Imawano	
 Nao Oikawa - Sexy Woman	
 Asuka Shibuya - Kyoko Imawano
 Jai West - Tonaka Kyoojoorou

Staff 
 Producers - Hinji Imamura, Richard Kekahuna (English adaptation), Nobuo Masuda (English adaptation), Tatsuya Yamaga.
 Executive producers - Ken Iyadomi (English adaptation), Akira Kanbe, Yo Umezaki.

External links 
 
 Amazon.com page for the complete collection

2004 Japanese television series debuts
2004 Japanese television series endings
Japanese comedy television series
Japanese horror fiction television series
TV Tokyo original programming